"Soul Feeling" is a song by Australian Australian R&B band Kulcha. It was released in January 1995 as the fourth and final single from the band's debut studio album Kulcha. The song peaked at number 16 in Australia and 18 in New Zealand.

Track listing

CD single
 "Soul Feeling" (radio edit) - 4:03
 "Soul Feeling" (remix) - 4:09
 "Soul Feeling" (instrumental) - 4:09

Charts

References

1994 songs
1995 singles
Kulcha (band) songs
Dance-pop songs